Epomophorinae is a subfamily of megabat.
It was established as a subfamily in 1997.
Epomophorine bats are found only in Africa.

Taxonomy
Tribe Epomophorini
Epomophorus
Micropteropus
Hypsignathus
Epomops
Nanonycteris
Tribe Myonycterini
Myonycteris
Lissonycteris
Megaloglossus
Tribe Scotonycterini
Scotonycteris
Casinycteris
Tribe Plerotini
Plerotes

References

Bat taxonomy
Mammal subfamilies
Megabats